Kenneth George Althaus, Sr. (June 13, 1895 – June 9, 1987) was a brigadier general in the United States Army during World War II. He served as commanding officer of the 11th Armored Regiment from 1943, then as commander of Combat Command A, 10th Armored Division from September 22, 1944.

Early life 
Althaus was born on June 13, 1893, in Cincinnati, Ohio. Prior to military service, he attended Queen City College.

Career 
Upon graduating from Queen City College, Althaus was commissioned to the 1st Infantry of the Ohio National Guard and the U.S Army from August 1916 to July 1917. Althaus was professor of military science and tactics at Alabama Polytechnic Institute from 1923 to 1927. He was also a professor at North Carolina State College from 1935 to 1940.

During the beginning of World War II, Althaus served as an Instructor of field artillery and assistant commander of Command "E". As Brigadier General, he commanded the 11th Armored Regiment  and Combat Command A, 10th Division.

Later life 
He retired on May 31, 1946.

Honors and awards 
Althaus was awarded the Bronze Star.

References

External links 

Kenneth George Althaus at findagrave.com

United States Army generals
United States Army personnel of World War II
1895 births
1987 deaths
Military personnel from Cincinnati